Seacombe Heights is a suburb of Adelaide in the City of Marion. It gets its name from Seacombe on the Wirral Cheshire, where many settlers emigrated from.

Area highlights include the Seacombe Heights Tennis Club on Grafton Street, where courts can be hired by the public. Seaview High School is located on a large land parcel within Seacombe Heights and features a large irrigated oval, popular with locals outside of school hours. 

Many Seacombe Heights locals enjoy nature walks in the O'Halloran Hill Conservation park.

References

See also
List of Adelaide suburbs

Suburbs of Adelaide